The  is an archaeological site containing the ruins of a Yayoi period settlement located in what is now the Hidaka neighborhood of the city of Takasaki, Gunma Prefecture in the northern Kantō region of Japan. The site was designated a National Historic Site of Japan in 1989, with the area designated expanded in 1998 and again in 2000.

Overview
The Hidaka site is located in the southern end of the Somagahara fluvial fan on the southeastern foothills of Mount Haruna. It was discovered in 1977 during preliminary survey work for the route of the Kan'etsu Expressway. Traces of rice paddy fields with footprints preserved, and the foundations of timber-framed buildings were discovered. Further in the hills, a cemetery was also discovered. The site covers an area of 6.3 hectares. The settlement was surrounded by  ring moat measuring 130 meters from east-to-west by 110 meters from north-to-south. Within were a total of 17 pit dwellings. The village site is preserved in good condition as it was covered with a volcanic ash layer from an eruption of Mount Asama, which provides a precise dating to the latter half of the 3rd century AD. 

The site, which is now a grassy field, having been backfilled after excavation, is located about 20 minutes on foot from the Ino Station on the JR East Joetsu Line.

See also
List of Historic Sites of Japan (Gunma)

References

External links
Takasaki City official site 

Yayoi period
History of Gunma Prefecture
Takasaki, Gunma
Archaeological sites in Japan
Historic Sites of Japan